Cook Strait separates the North and South Islands of New Zealand. The strait connects the Tasman Sea on the northwest with the South Pacific Ocean on the southeast. Regular ferry services run across the strait between Picton in the Marlborough Sounds and Wellington.

The strait is named after James Cook, the first European commander to sail through it, in 1770. In Māori it is named Te Moana-o-Raukawa, which means The Sea of Raukawa. Raukaua is a type of woody shrub native to New Zealand.

History

Approximately 18,000 years ago during the Last Glacial Maximum when sea levels were over 100 metres lower than present day levels, the Cook Strait was a deep harbour of the Pacific Ocean, disconnected from the Tasman Sea by the vast coastal plains which formed at the South Taranaki Bight which connected the North and South islands. Sea levels began to rise 7,000 years ago, eventually separating the islands and linking the Cook Strait to the Tasman Sea.

In Māori legend, Cook Strait was discovered by Kupe the navigator. Kupe followed in his canoe a monstrous octopus called Te Wheke-a-Muturangi across Cook Strait and destroyed it in Tory Channel or at Pātea.

When Dutch explorer Abel Tasman first saw New Zealand in 1642, he thought Cook Strait was a bight closed to the east. He named it Zeehaen's Bight, after the Zeehaen, one of the two ships in his expedition. In 1769 James Cook established that it was a strait, which formed a navigable waterway.

Cook Strait attracted European settlers in the early 19th century. Because of its use as a whale migration route, whalers established bases in the Marlborough Sounds and in the Kapiti area. From the late 1820s until the mid-1960s Arapaoa Island was a base for whaling in the Sounds. Perano Head on the east coast of the island was the principal whaling station for the area. The houses built by the Perano family are now operated as tourist accommodation.

During the 1820s Te Rauparaha led a Māori migration to, and the conquest and settlement of, the Cook Strait region.

From 1840 more permanent settlements sprang up, first at Wellington, then at Nelson and at Whanganui (Petre). At this period the settlers saw Cook Strait in a broader sense than today's ferry-oriented New Zealanders: for them the strait stretched from Taranaki to Cape Campbell, so these early towns all clustered around "Cook Strait" (or "Cook's Strait", in the pre-Geographic Board usage of the times) as the central feature and central waterway of the new colony.

In 1866, the first telegraph cable was laid in the Cook Strait, connecting the South Island telegraph system to Wellington.

Between 1888 and 1912 a Risso's dolphin named Pelorus Jack became famous for meeting and escorting ships around Cook Strait. Pelorus Jack was usually spotted in Admiralty Bay between Cape Francis and Collinet Point, near French Pass, a channel used by ships travelling between Wellington and Nelson. Pelorus Jack is also remembered after he was the subject of a failed assassination attempt. He was later protected by a 1904 New Zealand law.

At times when New Zealand feared invasion, various coastal fortifications were constructed to defend Cook Strait. During the Second World War, two  gun installations were constructed on Wrights Hill behind Wellington. In addition thirteen  gun installations were constructed around Wellington, along the Mākara coast, and at entrances to the Marlborough Sounds. The remains of most of these fortifications can still be seen.

The Pencarrow Head Lighthouse was the first permanent lighthouse built in New Zealand. Its first keeper, Mary Jane Bennett, was the only female lighthouse keeper in New Zealand's history. The light was decommissioned in 1935 when it was replaced by the Baring Head Lighthouse.

Timeline

 According to mythology the mythical navigator Kupe follows, in his canoe, the octopus Te Wheke-a-Muturangi across Cook Strait.
 1642: Abel Tasman mistook Cook Strait for a bight.
 1769: James Cook established it is a strait
 1822: Ngati Toa migrated to Cook Strait region, led by Te Rauparaha.
 1831: Whaling station established in Tory Channel.
 1851: The barque Maria wrecked on rocks at Cape Terawhiti, 28 people killed.
 1855: Severe earthquake on both sides of Cook Strait.
 1865: The paddle steamer City of Dunedin sank in Cook Strait, 50 to 60 people killed.
 1866: Cook Strait submarine telegraph cable laid.
 1869: St Vincent wrecked in Palliser Bay, 20 people killed.
 1879: Kangaroo laid the first telegraph cable across Cook Strait.
 1884: Lastingham wrecked at Cape Jackson, 18 people killed.
 1904: Pelorus Jack was protected by New Zealand law
 1909:  wrecked in Cook Strait, 75 people killed.
 1920: First aeroplane flight across Cook Strait.
 1935: Air services began across Cook Strait.
 1962: Cook Strait rail ferry service began.
 1962: Barrie Devenport swims the strait.
 1964: Cook Strait power cables laid.
 1968:  wrecked at entrance to Wellington harbour, 53 people killed.
 1975: First balloon crossing, made by Roland Parsons and Rex Brereton. 
 1975: Lynne Cox became the first woman to swim the strait.
 1979: Paul Caffyn crossed the strait in a sea kayak.
 1984: Philip Rush swam the strait both ways.
 1984: Meda McKenzie became the first woman to swim the strait both ways.
 1990: Stephen Preest made the first crossing and double crossing by hovercraft.
 1991: Five new power and communication cables laid
 1994: First fast-ferry service began operation across Cook Strait.
 2002: Two further communications cables laid.
 2005: The retired frigate  was sunk off Wellington as an artificial reef.
 2008: A resource consent was granted to Neptune Power to install a $10 million experimental underwater tidal stream turbine capable of producing one megawatt.
 2008: Energy Pacifica applies for resource consent to install up to 10 marine turbines, each able to produce up to 1.2 MW, near the Cook Strait entrance to Tory Channel.
 2013: First crossing made by a paraglider, achieved by Matt Stanford.
 2013: Two large earthquakes measuring 6.5 and 6.6 on the Richter Scale struck Cook Strait, causing significant damage in the town of Seddon, with minor to moderate damage in Wellington.
 2021: First electric aircraft flight across Cook Strait, from Omaka Aerodrome to Wellington Airport, by Gary Freedman in a Pipistrel Alpha Electro.

Geography 

The strait runs in a general NW-SE direction, with the South Island on the west side and North Island on the east. At its narrowest point,  separate Cape Terawhiti in the North Island from Perano Head on Arapaoa Island in the Marlborough Sounds. Perano Head is actually further north than Cape Terawhiti. In good weather one can see clearly across the strait.

The west (South Island) coast runs  along Cloudy Bay and past the islands and entrances to the Marlborough Sounds. The east (North Island) coast runs  along Palliser Bay, crosses the entrance to Wellington harbour, past some Wellington suburbs and continues another  to Mākara Beach.

The Brothers is a group of tiny islands in Cook Strait off the east coast of Arapaoa Island. North Brother island in this small chain is a sanctuary for the rare Brothers Island tuatara, while the largest of the islands is the site of the Brothers Island Lighthouse.

The shores of Cook Strait on both sides are mostly composed of steep cliffs. The rest of the bottom topography is complex. To the east is the Cook Strait Canyon with steep walls descending eastwards into the bathyal depths of the Hikurangi Trench. Fisherman's Rock in the north end of the Narrows Basin rises to within a few metres of low tide, and is marked by waves breaking in rough weather. A relatively shallow submarine valley lies across the northern end of the Marlborough Sounds. The bottom topography is particularly irregular around the coast of the South Island where the presence of islands, underwater rocks, and the entrances to the sounds, create violent eddies.

The South and North Islands were joined during the last ice age.

Oceanography

The waters of Cook Strait are dominated by strong tidal flows. The tidal flow through Cook Strait is unusual in that the tidal elevation at the ends of the strait are almost exactly out of phase with one another, so high water on one side meets low water on the other. This is because the main M2 lunar tide component that happens about twice per day (actually 12.42 hours) circulates anti-clockwise around New Zealand, and is out of phase at each end of the strait (see animation on the right). On the Pacific Ocean side the high tide occurs five hours before it occurs at the Tasman Sea side. On one side is high tide and on the other is low tide. The difference in sea level can drive tidal currents up to 2.5 metres per second (5 knots) across Cook Strait.

There are numerous computer models of the tidal flow through Cook Strait. While the tidal components are readily realizable, the residual flow is more difficult to model. Probably the most prolific oceanographer to research the strait was Ron Heath based at the N.Z. Oceanographic Institute.  He produced a number of studies including analysis of tides  which identified the presence of a "virtual amphidrome" in the region. Heath also quantified a best estimate for the time of the "residual current" (i.e. net current after averaging out the tidal influence) in the strait. This continues to be a topic of research with computer simulations combining with large datasets to refine the estimate.

Despite the strong currents, there is almost zero tidal height change in the centre of the strait. Instead of the tidal surge flowing in one direction for six hours and then in the reverse direction for six hours, a particular surge might last eight or ten hours with the reverse surge enfeebled. In especially boisterous weather conditions the reverse surge can be negated, and the flow can remain in the same direction through three surge periods and longer. This is indicated on marine charts for the region. Furthermore, the submarine ridges running off from the coast complicate the ocean flow and turbulence. The substantial levels of turbulence have been compared to that observed in the Straits of Gibraltar and Seymour Narrows in British Columbia.

Tidal power

The electrical power generated by tidal marine turbines varies as the cube of the tidal speed. Because the tidal speed doubles, eight times more tidal power is produced during spring tides than at neaps. Cook Strait has been identified as a potentially excellent source of tidal energy.

In April 2008, Neptune Power was granted a resource consent to install a $10 million experimental underwater tidal stream turbine capable of producing one megawatt. The company claimed there is enough tidal movement in Cook Strait to generate 12 GW of power, more than one-and-a-half times New Zealand's current requirements. In practice, only some of this energy could be harnessed. As of October 2016, this turbine had not been built and the Neptune Power website is a placeholder with no further announcements.

On the other side of the strait, Energy Pacifica applied for resource consent to install up to 10 marine turbines, each able to produce up to 1.2 MW, near the Cook Strait entrance to Tory Channel. However, despite being validated by computer modelling, no project was forthcoming.

Cables 

Electric power and communication cables link the North and South Islands across Cook Strait, operated by Transpower.

Three submarine power cables cross Cook Strait between Oteranga Bay in the North Island and Fighting Bay in the South Island as part of the HVDC Inter-Island, which provides an electricity link between Benmore in the South island and Haywards in the North Island. Each cable operates at 350 kV, and can carry up to 500 MW, with Pole 2 of the link using one cable and Pole 3 using two cables. The link's total capacity is 1200 MW (500MW for Pole 2 and 700MW for Pole 3). The cables are laid on the seabed within a legally defined zone called the cable protection zone (CPZ). Fishing activities and anchoring boats are prohibited within the CPZ.

Fibre optic cables carry telecommunications across Cook Strait, used by New Zealand's main telecommunication companies for domestic and commercial traffic and by Transpower for control of the HVDC link.

Marine life
Cook Strait is an important habitat for many cetacean species. Several dolphins (bottlenose, common, dusky) frequent the area along with killer whales and the endemic Hector's dolphins. Long-finned pilot whales often strand en masse at Golden Bay. The famous Pelorus Jack was a Risso's dolphin being observed escorting the ships between 1888 and 1912, though this species is not a common visitor to the New Zealand's waters. Large migratory whales attracted many whalers to the area in the winter. Currently, an annual survey of counting humpback whales is taken by Department of Conservation and former whalers help DOC to spot animals by using several vantage points along the strait such as on Stephens Island. Other occasional visitors include southern right whales, blue whales, sei whales and sperm whales. Giant squid specimens have been washed ashore around Cook Strait or found in the stomachs of sperm whales off Kaikoura.

A colony of male fur seals has long been established near Red Rocks on the south Wellington coast. Cook Strait offers good game fishing. Albacore tuna can be caught from January to May. Broadbill swordfish, bluenose, mako sharks and the occasional marlin and white shark can also be caught.

Transport

Regular ferry services run between Picton in the Marlborough Sounds and Wellington, operated by KiwiRail (the Interislander) and Strait Shipping (Bluebridge). Both companies run services several times a day. Roughly half the crossing is in the strait, and the remainder within the Sounds. The strait often experiences rough water and heavy swells from strong winds, especially from the south. New Zealand's position directly athwart the roaring forties means that the strait funnels westerly winds and deflects them into northerlies. As a result, ferry sailings are often disrupted and Cook Strait is regarded as one of the most dangerous and unpredictable waters in the world.

Of the 610 passengers and 123 crew on board, 53 died.

In 2006, 14-metre waves resulted in the Interislander ferry DEV Aratere slewing violently and heeling to 50 degrees. Three passengers and a crew member were injured, five rail wagons were toppled and many trucks and cars were heavily damaged. Maritime NZ's expert witness Gordon Wood claimed that if the ferry had capsized most passengers and crew would have been trapped inside and would have had no warning or time to put on lifejackets.

Air lines which operate or have operated flights across Cook Strait include Straits Air Freight Express, Air2there, CityJet and Sounds Air.

Swimming

According to oral tradition, the first woman to swim Cook Strait was Hine Poupou. She swam from Kapiti Island to d'Urville Island with the help of a dolphin. Other Māori accounts tell of at least one swimmer who crossed the strait in 1831. In modern times, the strait was swum by Barrie Devenport in 1962. Lynne Cox was the first woman to swim it, in 1975. The most prolific swimmer of the strait is Philip Rush, who has crossed eight times, including two double crossings. Aditya Raut was the youngest swimmer at 11 years. Caitlin O'Reilly was the youngest female swimmer and youngest New Zealander at 12 years. Pam Dickson was the oldest swimmer at 55 years. John Coutts was the first person to swim the strait in both directions. By 2010, 74 single crossings had been made by 65 individuals, and three double crossings had been made by two individuals (Philip Rush and Meda McKenzie). In March 2016, Marilyn Korzekwa became the first Canadian and oldest woman, at 58 years old, to swim the strait.

Crossing times by swimmers are largely determined by the strong and sometimes unpredictable currents that operate in the strait. In 1980 the oceanographer Ron Heath published an analysis of currents in Cook Strait using the tracks of swimmers. This was from a time when detailed measurement of ocean currents was technologically difficult.

See also
 Aotearoa Wave and Tidal Energy Association

Notes

References

External links

 Cook Strait: Ship Wrecks, Swells and Gales
 New Zealand's Cook Strait Rail Ferries – NZ National Maritime Museum
 Cook Strait rail ferries – New Zealand History, by Ministry for Culture and Heritage
 Cook Strait Swim
 NZ: Chance to turn the tide of power supply EnergyBulletin.net
 Lewis, Keith Submarine cables. Te Ara: The Encyclopedia of New Zealand, updated 21-Sep-2007.
 History of Cable Bay Station
 A Powerful link: The Cook Strait Cable
 NZ Documentary Film (2007) Fish & Ships. The Island Bay fishing fleet.

 
Articles containing video clips
Landforms of the Marlborough Region
Landforms of the Wellington Region
Straits of New Zealand
Whaling stations in New Zealand